Boston Calling Music Festival is a Boston-based music festival. The festival debuted in May 2013 and previously took place twice a year, May and September, at City Hall Plaza. The festival reportedly attracted 20,000–22,000 fans with its earlier editions, eventually drawing roughly 40,000 festival goers in 2017. In May 2016, Boston Calling announced it would move to the Harvard Athletic Complex in Allston in May 2017 and transition to one festival per year, with the new space allowing the addition of more music stages and the inclusion of stand-up comedy performers.

Boston's Calling's line-up is co-curated by Aaron Dessner of The National and is produced by Crash Line Productions, a Boston-based entertainment production company which also produces Eaux Claires Music & Arts Festival in Eau Claire, Wisconsin. Performers of past Boston Callings have included Sia, The National, Beck, My Morning Jacket, Of Monsters and Men, Fun., Kendrick Lamar, Passion Pit, Vampire Weekend, Modest Mouse, Airborne Toxic Event, Disclosure, Clairo, Eminem, Twenty One Pilots, Travis Scott, Tame Impala, Nine Inch Nails and Metallica.

Mass surveillance
The city of Boston spent $650,000 to test IBM software that monitored concertgoers from existing security cameras in May and September 2013.  Videos from the test were later found online by DigBoston, which reported on it in August 2014.  Though the city decided not to buy the software, it was criticized for not notifying concertgoers.  Participants in the test were reportedly able to search for people by head color, skin tone, clothing texture, and baldness; and to monitor the number of persons at the event and whether anyone was in a restricted area.

Lineups
Boston Calling was previously held twice a year in May and September. The festival's first two editions were two-day events. In its second year, Boston Calling expanded to three days.

Spring 2013
The first Boston Calling, held May 25 and 26, 2013 featured: 

Fun., The National, The Shins, Of Monsters and Men, Young the Giant, Marina and the Diamonds, Andrew Bird, Matt & Kim, Portugal. The Man, Dirty Projectors, Ra Ra Riot, Cults, The Walkmen, Youth Lagoon, MS MR, St. Lucia, Caspian, and Bad Rabbits.

Fall 2013
The second Boston Calling, held September 7 and 8, 2013 featured: 

Vampire Weekend, Passion Pit, Kendrick Lamar, Local Natives, Major Lazer, The Gaslight Anthem, The Airborne Toxic Event, Wolfgang Gartner, Solange, Bat for Lashes, Flosstradamus, Deer Tick, Okkervil River, Flume, Lucius, Big Black Delta, You Won't, and Bearstronaut.

Spring 2014
The third Boston Calling, held May 23, 24 and 25, 2014 featured: 

Jack Johnson, Death Cab for Cutie, Modest Mouse, The Decemberists, Edward Sharpe and the Magnetic Zeros, Brand New, The Head and the Heart, Tegan and Sara, Bastille, Jenny Lewis, Frank Turner and the Sleeping Souls, The Neighbourhood, Phosphorescent, Built to Spill, Kurt Vile and the Violators, Walk Off the Earth, Warpaint, Cass McCombs, Maxïmo Park, The Districts, Tigerman WOAH!, and Magic Man.

Fall 2014

The fourth Boston Calling, held September 5, 6 and 7, 2014 featured: 

The National, Lorde, The Replacements, Nas x The Roots, Neutral Milk Hotel, Childish Gambino, Spoon, Girl Talk, The 1975, Volcano Choir, Twenty One Pilots, The War on Drugs, The Hold Steady, Lake Street Dive, Bleachers, White Denim, Sky Ferreira, Future Islands, San Fermin, S. Carey, CliffLight, and Gentlemen Hall.

Spring 2015
The fifth Boston Calling, held May 22, 23 and 24, 2015 featured: 

Beck, Pixies, My Morning Jacket, Ben Harper and the Innocent Criminals, Tenacious D, Tame Impala, St. Vincent, TV on the Radio, Marina and the Diamonds, Jason Isbell, Gerard Way, Tove Lo, Chet Faker, Run the Jewels, The Lone Bellow, Sharon Van Etten, Jungle, MØ, ILoveMakonnen, DMA's, The Ballroom Thieves, and Krill.

Fall 2015
The sixth Boston Calling, held September 25, 26 and 27, 2015 featured: 

The Avett Brothers, Alt-J, Alabama Shakes, Hozier, Of Monsters and Men, Chvrches, Ben Howard, Chromeo, Walk the Moon, Nate Ruess, Father John Misty, Sturgill Simpson, MisterWives, Gerard Way and the Hormones, Daughter, Twin Shadow, Stephen Malkmus and the Jicks, Fidlar, Doomtree, Gregory Alan Isakov, Grizfolk, Bully, Dirty Bangs, and Grey Season.

Spring 2016
The seventh Boston Calling, held May 27, 28 and 29, 2016 featured: 

Sia, Disclosure, Robyn, ODESZA, Sufjan Stevens, Haim, Miike Snow, Janelle Monáe, City and Colour, Courtney Barnett, Elle King, The Front Bottoms, BØRNS, Charles Bradley and his Extraordinaires, The Vaccines, Vince Staples, Battles, Unknown Mortal Orchestra, Christine and the Queens, Lisa Hannigan and Aaron Dessner, Lizzo, Palehound, and Michael Christmas.

2017
The eighth Boston Calling, held May 26, 27 and 28, 2017 for the first time at the Harvard Athletic Complex, featured: 

Chance the Rapper, Bon Iver, Sigur Ros, Migos, Mac Demarco, Sylvan Esso, Car Seat Headrest, Francis and the Lights, Deerhoof, Whitney, Lucy Dacus, Vundabar, Xylouris White, Mumford and Sons, The xx, The 1975,  Nathaniel Rateliff and the Night Sweats, Tegan and Sara, Brandi Carlile, Majid Jordan, Oh Wonder, Danny Brown, Cousin Stizz, Russ, Strand of Oaks, Moses Sumney, Kevin Morby, Tkay Maidza, Alexandra Savior, Tool, Major Lazer, Weezer, Cage the Elephant, Run the Jewels, Flatbush Zombies, Converge, Piebald, Wolf Parade, Frightened Rabbit, Buffalo Tom, PUP, Hiss Golden Messenger, The Hotelier, and Mondo Cozmo.

2018
The ninth Boston Calling was held on May 25, 26 and 27, 2018 at the Harvard Athletic Complex. The headliners were Eminem, The Killers and Jack White.
Line-up

Eminem
The Killers
Jack White
Queens of the Stone Age
The National
Paramore
Tyler, the Creator
Khalid
Bryson Tiller (replaced by Mike D)
Portugal. The Man
Fleet Foxes
St. Vincent
The Decemberists
Brockhampton
Maggie Rogers
Royal Blood
Manchester Orchestra
Daniel Caesar
Dirty Projectors
Stormzy (replaced by Cousin Stizz)
Thundercat
Belly
Pussy Riot
Julien Baker
Alvvays
The Menzingers
Thee Oh Sees
Perfume Genius
Noname
(Sandy) Alex G
Big Thief
Mount Kimbie
Citizen
Pond
Zola Jesus
Taylor Bennett
Westside Gunn & Conway
Charly Bliss
Leikeli47
Field Report
Lillie Mae
Tauk
This Is the Kit
Weakened Friends
Stl Gld

2019 
The tenth edition of the festival.  Boston Calling was held on May 24, 25 and 26, 2019 at the Harvard Athletic Complex. The headliners this year were Twenty One Pilots, Travis Scott, and Tame Impala.

Line-up

 Twenty One Pilots
 Travis Scott
 Tame Impala
 Odesza
 Logic
 Greta Van Fleet
Chvrches
 Anderson .Paak & The Free Nationals
 Hozier
 Janelle Monáe (Canceled)
 Brandi Carlile
 Lord Huron
 Sheck Wes
 Rainbow Kitten Surprise
 Christine and the Queens
 Big Red Machine
 King Princess
 Black Star
 Guster
 Marina
 Mitski
 Tank and the Bangas
 Clairo
 Mura Masa
 Denzel Curry
 Snakehips
 Yaeji
 Princess Nokia
 Chromeo (DJ set)
 Snail Mail
 Ravyn Lenae
 Gang of Youths
 Young Fathers
 Superorganism
 Turnstile
 SOB x RBE
 Cautious Clay
 Shame
 Pale Waves
 Pile
 Rolling Blackouts Coastal Fever
 Dessa
 White Reaper
 Sidney Gish
 Kilo Kish
 Skegss
 Sasha Sloan
 Naeem
 Adia Victoria
 Easy Life

 2019 Comedy & Entertainment
 Michael Che
 Jenny Slate
 Fred Armisen
 Imogen Heap
 Boston Ballet
 Melissa Villaseñor
 Sam Jay
 Marina Franklin
 Lamont Price

2020 
On March 31, 2020, it was announced that the 2020 Boston Calling Festival would be cancelled due to the COVID-19 pandemic. The organizers have offered refunds for tickets, as well as the option to roll their tickets over to the 2021 festival.

2022 
The eleventh edition of the festival.  Boston Calling was held on May 27, 28 and 29, 2022 at the Harvard Athletic Complex. The headliners this year were Metallica and Nine Inch Nails (replacing both The Foo Fighters and The Strokes after the latter cancelled due to COVID-19).  The festival was evacuated for approximately two hours on Saturday due to nearby lightning in accord with Live Nation's weather policies.

Friday Line-up

 Nine Inch Nails
 Rufus Du Sol
 Haim
 Avril Lavigne
 Cheap Trick
 Oliver Tree
 The Struts
 Paris Jackson
 Paris Texas
 The Backseat Lovers
 Grandson
 Mob Rich
 Pom Pom Squad
 Born without Bones
 Avenue
 Miranda Rae
 The Chelsea Curve

Saturday Line-up
 
 Nine Inch Nails
 Run the Jewels
 Black Pumas
 Earthgang
 Orville Peck
 KennyHoopla
 Celisse (set cut short due to weather)
 Frances Forever (cancelled due to weather)
 Sudan Archives (cancelled due to weather)
 Coral Moons (cancelled due to weather)
 Ali McGurk (cancelled due to weather)
 Hinds
 Julie Rhodes
 Charlotte Sands
 Van Buren Records
 Dutch Tulips
 The Strokes (cancelled due to COVID)
 King Gizzard & the Lizard Wizard (cancelled due to COVID)

Sunday Line-up

 Metallica
 Weezer
 Glass Animals
 Modest Mouse
 Goose
 Ripe
 Japanese Breakfast
 Cults
 Peach Tree Rascals
 Horsegirl
 DJO
 Oompa
 Cliff Notez
 Cam Meekins
 Crooked Coast
 Aaron and the Lord
 Paper Tigers

2023 
The twelfth edition of the festival. Boston Calling is scheduled to be held on May 26, 27 and 28, 2023 at the Harvard Athletic Complex. The main headliners this year will be Foo Fighters (in their first official concert since drummer Taylor Hawkins' death the previous year), The Lumineers and Paramore, with co-headlining slots taken by Yeah Yeah Yeahs, Alanis Morissette and Queens of the Stone Age.

Friday Line-up

 Foo Fighters
 Yeah Yeah Yeahs
 The National
 Niall Horan
 Chelsea Cutler
 Teddy Swims
 Léon
 Talk
 Celisse
 The Beachea
 Zolita
 GA-20
 Alisa Amador
 Little Fuss
 Blue Light Bandits
 Summer Cult
 Brandie Blaze

Saturday Line-up

 The Lumineers
 Alanis Morissette
 Noah Kahan
 The Flaming Lips
 Mt. Joy
 Fletcher
 Joy Oladokun
 Declan McKenna
 The Aces
 Loveless
 Welshly Arms
 Neemz
 The Q-Tip Bandits
 Najee Janey
 Actor Observer
 Coral Moons
 Chrysalis

Sunday Line-up
 
 Paramore
 Queens of the Stone Age
 Bleachers
 King Gizzard and the Lizard Wizard
 Maren Morris
 070 Shake
 The Walkmen
 The Linda Lindas
 Wunderhorse
 Genesis Owusu
 Brutus
 Juice
 Mint Green
 Couch
 Ali McGuirk
 Sorry Mom
 Workman Song

References

Festivals in Boston
Music festivals in Massachusetts